David Fernando Montoya Vélez (born February 14, 1978) is a Colombian former professional footballer who played as a midfielder.

In the 2003 Copa Libertadores, Montoya scored 4 goals, most notably the one he scored to give Independiente Medellín the victory against Boca Juniors.

In 2010, he transferred to Venezuelan club Deportivo Lara, and retired after the 2010–11 Venezuelan Primera División season ended.

Montoya made four appearances for Colombia at the 2003 Gold Cup.

External links

1978 births
Living people
Colombian footballers
Footballers from Medellín
Colombia international footballers
2003 CONCACAF Gold Cup players
Categoría Primera A players
Ecuadorian Serie A players
Independiente Medellín footballers
Club Atlético Zacatepec players
L.D.U. Quito footballers
Independiente Santa Fe footballers
Deportivo Pasto footballers
Asociación Civil Deportivo Lara players
Colombian expatriate footballers
Expatriate footballers in Mexico
Expatriate footballers in Ecuador
Expatriate footballers in Venezuela
Association football midfielders